This is a list of lakes and reservoirs in the state of Pennsylvania in the United States.

Lakes
 Allegheny Reservoir (also known as Kinzua Lake)
 Antietam Lake
 Aylesworth Creek Lake
 Baylors Lake
 Bear Lake
 Beaver Lake
 Beaver Run Reservoir
 Beechwood Lake
 Belmont Lake (Pennsylvania)
 Beltzville Lake
 Bessemer Lake
 Black Moshannon Lake
 Blacks Lake
 Blue Marsh Lake
 Bonin Lake
 Bradford Reservoir
 Briar Creek Reservoir
 Canadohta Lake
 Canoe Creek Lake
 Canonsburg Lake
 Chambers Lake
 Chapman Lake
 Churchville Reservoir
 Clear Lake
 Clearwater Lake
 Cloe Lake
 Coatesville Reservoir
 Colyer Lake
 Conemaugh River Lake
 Conneaut Lake
 Cowanesque Lake
 Cowans Gap Lake
 Cranberry Glade Lake
 Crooked Creek Lake
 Comminds Pond
 Curwensville Lake
 Donegal Lake
 Duke Lake
 Duman Lake
 Dunlap Creek Lake
 Dutch Fork Lake
 East Branch Clarion River Lake
 Eaton Reservoir
 Edinboro Lake
 Eldridge Lake
 Fairview Gravel Pits
 Fords Lake
 Foster Joseph Sayers Reservoir
 Frances Slocum Lake
 Fuller Lake
 Glade Lake
 Glade Run Lake
 Glendale Lake
 Gouldsboro Lake
 Green Lake
 Green Lick Reservoir
 Halfway Lake
 Hamilton Lake
 Hammond Lake
 Harris Pond
 Harveys Lake (Pennsylvania)
 Hereford Manor Lakes
 Highland Lake
 High Point Lake
 Hills Creek Lake
 Holman Lake
 Hopewell Lake
 Howard Eaton Reservoir
 Humboldt Reservoir
 Hunters Lake
 Justus Lake
 Kaercher Creek Lake
 Kahle Lake
 Kelsey Creek Lake
 Kettle Creek Reservoir
 Keystone Lake (Armstrong County)
 Keystone Lake (Westmoreland County)
 Kinzua Lake (also known as Allegheny Reservoir) see Allegheny Reservoir
 Kinzua Pumped Storage Reservoir
 Kooser Lake
 Lackawanna Lake
 Lake Aldred
 Lake Arthur
 Lake Augusta
 Lake Bresci
 Lake Canadohta
 Lake Chillisquaque
 Lake Clarke
 Lake Erie
 Lake Frances
 Lake Galena (Pennsylvania) (Peace valley Reservoir)
 Lake Gordon
 Lake Grubb
 Lake Jean
 Lake Koon
 Lake Luxembourg
 Lake LeBoeuf or LeBoeuf Lake
 Lake Louise
 Lake Manjo
 Lake Marburg
 Lake Muhlenberg
 Lake Nadine
 Lake Nephawin
 Lake Nessmuk
 Lake Nockamixon
 Lake of the Meadows
 Lake Ondawa
 Lake Ontelaunee
 Lake Pleasant
 ((Lake Redman))
 Lake Scranton
 Lake Sheridan
 Lake Towhee
 Lake Wallenpaupack
 Lake Wesauking
 Lake Wilhelm
 Lake Winola
 Laurel Hill Lake
 Laurel Lake
 Leaser Lake
 Leisure Lakes
 Levittown Lake
 Lily Lake
 Little Pine Lake (Pennsylvania)
 Locust Lake
 ((Long Arm Reservoir)) Adams County
 ((Long Pine Run Reservoir)) Adams County
 Long Pond (Lake Alden)
 Lower Woods Pond
 Loyalhanna Lake
 Lyman Run Lake
 Mahoning Creek Lake
 Marsh Creek Lake
 Mauch Chunk Lake
 Meadow Grounds Lake
 Memorial Lake
 Mill Creek Reservoir
 Miller Pond
 Minsi Lake
 Mitchell Lake
 Mountain Springs Lake
 Nessmuk Lake
 North Lake
 Number 2 Reservoir
 Number 3 Reservoir
 Number 5 Reservoir
 Opossum Lake
 Page Lake
 Panther Hollow Lake
 Parker Lake
 Pinchot Lake
 Pine Cradle Lake
 Poe Lake
 Promised Land Lake
 Prompton Lake
 Pymatuning Reservoir (Also extends into Ohio)
 Raccoon Lake
 Raystown Lake
 Rose Valley Lake
 Round Valley Reservoir
 Sand Spring Lake
 Sandy Lake
 Scotts Run Lake
 Shawnee Lake
 Shenango River Lake
 Smith Reservoir
 Speedwell Forge Lake
 Springton Reservoir
 Spruce Run Reservoir
 Starlight Lake
 Stephen Foster Lake
 Struble Lake
 Sugar Lake
 Susquehanna Lake
 Sweet Arrow Lake
 Tamarack Lake
 Tioga-Hammond Lakes
 Tioga Reservoir
 Tionesta Lake
 Tobyhanna Lake
 Trout Lake
 Troy Reservoir
 Tuscarora Lake
 Twin Lakes
 Union City Reservoir
 Upper Woods Pond
 Virgin Run Lake
 Walker Lake
 Whipple Dam Lake
 Woodcock Creek Lake
 Yellow Creek Lake
 Yosets Lake
 Youghiogheny River Lake (Also extends into Maryland)

List of ponds in Pennsylvania

 Agnew Pond (Bradford County)
 Bayards Pond (Bradford County)
 Beaver Meadow Pond (Bradford & Susquehanna counties)
 Bert Jayne Pond (Bradford County)
 Bird Pond (Bradford County)
 Blakeslee Pond (Bradford County)
 Brown Pond (Bradford County)
 Browns Pond (Warren County)
 Cash Pond (Bradford County)
 Cooks Pond (Bradford County)
 Gulf Pond (Bradford County)
 Haig Pond (Bradford County)
 Holcomb Pond (Bradford County)
 Little Pond (Bradford County)
 McCloe Pond (Bradford County)
 Miller Pond (Bradford County)
 Mud Pond (Bradford County)
 Saxe Pond (Bradford County)
 Shores Pond (Bradford County)
 Stacey Pond (Bradford County)
 Stowell Pond (Bradford County)
 Sunfish Pond (Bradford County)
 Tauscher Pond (Tioga County)

See also

List of rivers of Pennsylvania

References

External links
Pennsylvania Fish and Boat Commission maps and guides

Lakes
Pennsylvania